Alice FitzAlan (or Fitzalan) may refer to:

 Alice de Warenne, Countess of Arundel (1287–1338), wife of Edmund FitzAlan, 9th Earl of Arundel

 Alice FitzAlan, Countess of Kent, daughter of Richard FitzAlan, 10th Earl of Arundel
 Alice FitzAlan, Baroness Cherleton, daughter of Richard FitzAlan, 11th Earl of Arundel